Ian Wrigley (6 April 1923 – 6 June 2018) was an Australian sports shooter. He competed in the 300 metre rifle event at the 1956 Summer Olympics.

References

1923 births
2018 deaths
Australian male sport shooters
Olympic shooters of Australia
Shooters at the 1956 Summer Olympics
Sportspeople from Sydney